Namosi-Naitasiri-Serua is an Oceanic language spoken in Fiji by about 1,600 people.

References

West Fijian languages
Languages of Fiji